Lamprosema platyproctalis is a moth in the family Crambidae. It was described by George Hampson in 1918. It is found in the Kei Islands of Indonesia.

References

Moths described in 1918
Lamprosema
Moths of Indonesia